Corny Ostermann, born Cornelius Andreas Oostermann (born September 18, 1911 in Linden (now part of Hannover)–died during the Second World War; officially declared dead in 1949) was a German musician and jazz bandleader.

Osterman was active with a swing orchestra in Berlin in the late 1930s despite the Nazi government's ban on swing music. Between 1938 and 1943 he recorded shellacs with his orchestra, some of them re-edited later. As late as 1943, he was playing in the orchestra of Helmut Gardens. After his conscription into Wehrmacht, he went missing and was officially declared dead in 1949.

Literature 
 Jürgen Wölfer: Jazz in Deutschland – Das Lexikon. Alle Musiker und Plattenfirmen von 1920 bis heute. Hannibal Verlag: Höfen 2008, .

External links

References

1911 births
1945 deaths
German jazz musicians
German military personnel killed in World War II
Missing in action of World War II